Zulu is a 2013 French-South African crime film directed by Jérôme Salle and starring Orlando Bloom and Forest Whitaker. It was selected as the closing film at the 2013 Cannes Film Festival. The film is partly based on Project Coast, the program for biological and chemical weapons of the South African apartheid regime, and the book Zulu by author Caryl Férey, winner of the French Grand Prix for Best Crime Novel of 2008.

Plot
As a child in Cape Town, Ali Sokhela (Forest Whitaker) witnesses the murder of his father via necklacing. Fleeing his father's murderers and on the run, a police dog hunts down Ali, leading to him being rendered a eunuch with active support of one of three white South African policemen.

In present day, Ali is a homicide detective of the South African Police, partnered with fellow detectives Brian Epkeen (Orlando Bloom) and Dan Fletcher (Conrad Kemp). The men are called to investigate the murder of Judith Botha, a young woman found in the local Botanical Gardens, only to uncover that Judith was alive and her best friend Nicole Weiss is the victim, however who was found with Judith’s ID. She had been beaten to death. While interviewed, Judith claims that Nicole previously spent the evening with her boyfriend. Ali encounters two young boys violently fighting, both flee after Ali defuses the fight. Ali finds a white substance at the scene, a new form of toke, a psychologically manipulating drug with severe effects depending on dosage, as well as other factors. Meanwhile, Brian is revealed to be in the process of divorce from his Ruby, his ex-wife, whom he had betrayed, in turn leading to her engaging with a rich dentist. Brian's teenage son David also grew distant from him. Brian lives a bachelor lifestyle, seems always broke, and is a functioning alcoholic.

Ali confronts exotic dancer Zina at her club "Sundance", who identifies Nicole's boyfriend as Stan Kwalana, a local drug dealer. At the same time, the department secretary Janet traces Nicole's phone to Muizenberg Beach. Upon arriving, Ali, Brian and Dan are attacked by a band of criminals, who proceed to mortally wound Dan with a machete, though Ali and Brian kill the remnants; Dan later dies in hospital, leaving his wife Claire grief stricken. Following Dan's funeral, Ali is assigned by CTPD Captain Paul Kruger to investigate Cat, a crime lord with connections to Dan's killers. Cat denies knowledge of the crime, however is later revealed to be the distributor of the toke and Stan, having overdosed on the drug had unintentionally killed Nicole in a fit of blind rage, was his unwilling accomplice.

The following day, another woman, Kate Montgomery, is found dead in the same fashion as Nicole on Long Island Beach; Ali and Brian uncover the Zulu warrior message "Bazukala" carved upon her chest. Later that same day, Stan's severed head is recovered. Ali and Brian once again confront Cat. Surprisingly, the surviving criminals from Muizenberg Beach attack Cat's hideout, killing several of his men. Ali and Brian pursue the criminals, but they are killed by Cat's thugs and Ali is wounded during the pursuit. Brian returns to the precinct and uncovers that Stan has, in the meanwhile, been labelled as Nicole's and Kate's killer, but Ali refuses to believe the case is closed because Stan was illiterate. Following a lead, Brian runs into local ranger Tara, who reveals she saw a black jeep parked outside Muizenberg Beach at the time of Dan's murder.

Without support of the CTPD, Brian and Janet privately continue to investigate together, uncovering the identity of Doctor Joost Opperman, a former scientist of "Project Coast", which intended to unleash biological weaponry to be used against the Soviet Union during the Cold War. Many scientists had also vowed to eradicate the black population of South Africa, claiming they were simply following orders. Brian suspects Opperman had invented the toke to achieve the renewed goal of decimating the black population. Aware of their connections to Project Coast, Brian infiltrates the headquarters of the DPS, a private militia headed by Frank De Beer; Brian finds one of the vehicles as the same one found at Muizenberg Beach the day of Dan's death, confirming their involvement with Opperman. Later that day, Josephine, Ali's mother, is murdered in her home by Cat, having been informed of the investigation by Ali and, unwittingly, following the hottest lead regarding how the toke was distributed among the population in the township. Upon hearing of his mother's death, Ali learns from Cat's mistress that Cat retreated to the Namib Desert with Opperman; fuelled with rage, Ali flies to Namibia to hunt down Cat.

Upon gathering the evidence to prosecute Opperman, Brian receives word that Ruby and her husband Rick have been taken captive by De Beer, demanding Brian relinquish the evidence in exchange for their lives. Upon arriving, Brian is captured and beaten. Rick shows his character, attempting to bribe his own freedom, but gets shot by De Beer. After De Beer departs for Namibia, Brian breaks free and kills the resident agent, saving Ruby; the evidence confirms that De Beer murdered Kate, who actually overdosed the toke while hanging out with Stan; Cat later kills Stan. Ali and Brian arrive outside Opperman's headquarters in the Namib Desert, where a revenge shootout happens; Brian captures and arrests De Beer, and Ali shotguns Cat, but his wound opens again in the process. Opperman flees across the desert, Ali pursues him on feet until morning; both men lead each other to exhaustion. Upon capturing him, Ali bludgeons Opperman to death, before succumbing to his wound and dying. Brian arrives on the scene, searching for Ali with a helicopter, he finds Opperman and recovers Ali's body.

Upon returning to Cape Town, Brian buries Ali and takes the opportunity to name his father's tombstone too.

Cast
 Orlando Bloom as Brian Epkeen
 Forest Whitaker as Ali Sokhela
 Tanya van Graan as Tara
 Natasha Loring as Marjorie
 Sven Ruygrok as David Epkeen
 Adrian Galley as Nils Botha
 Conrad Kemp as Dan Fletcher
 Roxanne Prentice as Judith Botha
 Tinarie Van Wyk-Loots as Claire Fletcher
 Dean Slater as Rick
 Kelsey Egan as Nicole Weiss
 Khulu Skenjana as Themba
 Hennie Bosman as Shaved Head
 Joelle Kayembe as Zina

Release
The film premiered at the 2013 Cannes Film Festival on 26 May as the closing night film. It later opened in France on 4 December 2013. In South Africa, the film was renamed as City of Violence.

Following the premiere at Cannes, the film was picked up for U.S. distribution by the Weinstein Co. However, as of 2017, the film did not have a U.S. release date. Director Jérôme Salle announced that Harvey Weinstein had yet to release it because he probably thought it was "too SA for US audiences."

References

External links
 
 

2013 films
2013 crime action films
2010s English-language films
South African crime action films
English-language French films
English-language South African films
Apartheid films
Films scored by Alexandre Desplat
Films directed by Jérôme Salle
Films set in Cape Town
Films shot in South Africa
French crime action films
2010s French films